Kumandoi Petcharoenvit also known as Kumandoi PetchyindeeAcademy is a Thai Muay Thai fighter and boxer.

Muay thai career
Kumandoi was booked to face Yothin FA Group for the vacant 118 lbs True4u Muaymumwansuek title at the Rangsit Stadium on December 23, 2016. He lost the fight by decision.

Kumandoi was scheduled to fight Petchrung Sor.Jor.Vichitpaedriw for the Blue Arena 118 lbs title at the Blue Arena on January 7, 2018. He lost the fight by decision.

Kumandoi challenged the reigning Rajadamnern Stadium 115 lbs champion Phetsuphan Por.Daorungruang on March 5, 2018. He lost the fight by decision.

Kumandoi captured his second professional title, the WBC Muay Thai World 122 lbs belt, on December 13, 2018, with a decision victory against Kumangoen Jitmuangnon.

During the year 2019 Kumandoi was undefeated at Rajadamnern Stadium in six fights. He was voted runner-up for the stadium Fighter of the Year award, losing it to Saotho Sitchefboontham.

Kumandoi made his kickboxing debut against Tenshin Nasukawa at Rizin 26 – Saitama on December 31, 2020. He lost the fight by unanimous decision.

Kumandoi is scheduled to face the Thailand Sports Authority Fighter of the Year runner-up Petchsila Wor.Auracha on March 10, 2022, at the Rajadamnern Stadium, for both the True4u and Rajadamnern Stadium 115 lbs titles. He won the fight by decision.

Kumandoi was booked to face the former two-weight True4u champion Kaito Fukuda at Suk Wanchai MuayThai Super Fight on April 24, 2022 for the inaugural IMSA World Super Bantamweight title. He lost the fight by unanimous decision after being knocked down in the first round.

Titles and accomplishments

Muay Thai
Omnoi Stadium
 2014 Omnoi Stadium 112 lbs Champion
World Boxing Council Muaythai
 2018 WBC Muay Thai World 122 lbs Champion
Rajadamnern Stadium
 2022 Rajadamnern Stadium 115 lbs Champion
Petchyindee True4U
 2022 True4U 115 lbs Champion

Professional boxing record

Muay Thai record

|-  style="background:#cfc;"
| 2023-02-21|| Win ||align=left| Saotho Or.Atchariya  || Muaymansananmuang|| Bangkok, Thailand || Decision || 5||3:00

|-  style="background:#cfc;"
| 2023-01-26||Win ||align=left| Pangtor Por.Lakboon  || Petchyindee, Rajadamnern Stadium|| Bangkok, Thailand || Decision ||5 ||3:00
|-  style="background:#cfc;"
| 2022-11-12|| Win||align=left| PetchAnuwat Nor.AnuwatGym  || Muay Thai Vithee Tin Thai + Petchyindee Sanjorn|| Chiang Rai province, Thailand || Decision|| 5||3:00

|-  style="background:#cfc;"
| 2022-10-22|| Win||align=left| Phetsommai Sor.Sommai  || Ruamponkon Meepuen|| Samut Sakhon province, Thailand || KO (Left Hook)||  1||

|-  style="background:#fbb;"
| 2022-09-08|| Loss ||align=left| Petchsila Wor.Auracha ||Petchyindee, Rajadamnern Stadium || Bangkok, Thailand || Decision (Unanimous) || 5||3:00
|-
! style=background:white colspan=9 |

|-  style="background:#fbb;"
| 2022-07-05|| Loss||align=left| Saoek Or.Atchariya || Muaymansananmuang, Rangsit Stadium|| Bangkok, Thailand || Decision (Majority) || 5||3:00
|-
! style=background:white colspan=9 |

|-  style="text-align:center; background:#fbb;"
| 2022-04-24|| Loss ||align=left| Kaito Wor.Wanchai|| Suk Wanchai MuayThai Super Fight  || Nagoya, Japan ||Decision (Unanimous) ||5 ||3:00 
|-
! style=background:white colspan=9 |
|-  style="background:#cfc;"
| 2022-03-10|| Win ||align=left| Petchsila Wor.Auracha ||Petchyindee, Rajadamnern Stadium || Bangkok, Thailand || Decision || 5 || 3:00
|-
! style=background:white colspan=9 |
|-  style="background:#cfc;"
| 2022-01-21|| Win ||align=left| Puenkon Tor.Surat ||Petchyindee, Rangsit Stadium ||Rangsit, Thailand || Decision ||5  ||3:00
|-  style="background:#fbb;"
| 2021-11-05|| Loss ||align=left| Saoek Or.Atchariya || Muaymanwansuk || Buriram Province, Thailand || Decision|| 5||3:00
|-  style="background:#cfc;"
| 2021-10-14|| Win ||align=left| Diesellek Petchyindee Academy || Petchyindee + Muay Thai Moradok Kon Thai || Buriram Province, Thailand || Decision || 5 ||3:00 
|-  style="background:#cfc;"
| 2021-04-09|| Win ||align=left|  Petchtawee Sor.Pongamon || Suk Pitaktam, Lumpinee Stadium || Bangkok, Thailand || Decision || 5 || 3:00
|-  style="background:#c5d2ea;"
| 2021-03-15 || Draw ||align=left| Saoek Sitchefboontham || Chef Boontham, Rangsit Stadium || Rangsit, Thailand || Decision || 5 || 3:00
|-  style="background:#fbb;"
| 2020-12-31|| Loss || align=left| Tenshin Nasukawa ||Rizin 26 – Saitama ||  Saitama, Japan || Decision (Unanimous) || 3 || 3:00
|-  style="background:#fbb;"
| 2020-11-07 || Loss ||align=left| Saoek Sitchefboontham || SAT HERO SERIES, World Siam Stadium || Bangkok, Thailand || TKO (Doctor Stoppage) || 4||
|-  style="background:#cfc;"
| 2020-10-08|| Win||align=left| Petchsuntri Jitmuangnon || Jitmuangnon, Rajadamnern Stadium || Bangkok, Thailand || Decision || 5 || 3:00
|-  style="background:#fbb;"
| 2020-09-01|| Loss||align=left| Saoek Sitchefboontham || Chef Boontham, Thanakorn Stadium || Nakhon Pathom Province, Thailand || Decision || 5 || 3:00
|-  style="background:#cfc;"
| 2020-08-04|| Win||align=left| Saotho Sitchefboontham || Chef Boontham, Thanakorn Stadium || Nakhon Pathom Province, Thailand || Decision || 5 || 3:00
|-  style="background:#cfc;"
| 2020-03-12|| Win||align=left| Saotho Sitchefboontham || Sor.Sommai, Rajadamnern Stadium || Bangkok, Thailand || Decision || 5 || 3:00
|-  style="background:#cfc;"
| 2019-12-12|| Win ||align=left| Puenkon Tor.Surat || Onesongchai, Rajadamnern Stadium || Bangkok, Thailand || Decision || 5 || 3:00
|-  style="background:#cfc;"
| 2019-10-14|| Win ||align=left| Diesellek Wor.Wanchai || Wanmeechai, Rajadamnern Stadium || Bangkok, Thailand || Decision || 5 || 3:00
|-  style="background:#cfc;"
| 2019-08-29|| Win ||align=left| Puenkon Tor.Surat || Onesongchai, Rajadamnern Stadium || Bangkok, Thailand || Decision || 5 || 3:00
|-  style="background:#cfc;"
| 2019-07-22|| Win ||align=left| Hercules Phetsimean || Petchwittaya, Rajadamnern Stadium || Bangkok, Thailand || Decision || 5 || 3:00
|-  style="background:#cfc;"
| 2019-06-06|| Win ||align=left| Phetsuphan Por.Daorungruang || Onesongchai, Rajadamnern Stadium || Bangkok, Thailand || KO (Head Kick) || 2 ||
|-  style="background:#cfc;"
| 2019-03-31|| Win ||align=left| Pornpitak SorTor.Tanomsribangpu || Muay Dee Vithithai, Blue Arena || Samut Prakan, Thailand || KO || 4 ||
|-  style="background:#cfc;"
| 2019-02-28|| Win ||align=left| Kongmuangtrang Kaewsamrit || Onesongchai, Rajadamnern Stadium || Bangkok, Thailand || Decision || 5 || 3:00
|-  style="background:#fbb;"
| 2019-01-24|| Loss||align=left| Puenkon Tor.Surat || Onesongchai, Rajadamnern Stadium || Bangkok, Thailand || Decision || 5 || 3:00
|-  style="background:#cfc;"
| 2018-12-13|| Win ||align=left| Kumangoen Jitmuangnon || Jitmuangnon, Rajadamnern Stadium || Bangkok, Thailand || Decision (Unanimous) || 5 || 3:00 
|-
! style=background:white colspan=9 |
|-  style="background:#cfc;"
| 2018-11-21|| Win ||align=left| Konkhon Kiatphontip || Onesongchai, Rajadamnern Stadium || Bangkok, Thailand || KO || 4 ||
|-  style="background:#fbb;"
| 2018-09-24|| Loss||align=left| Sanpetch Sor.Salacheep || Onesongchai, Rajadamnern Stadium || Bangkok, Thailand || Decision || 5 || 3:00
|-  style="background:#c5d2ea;"
| 2018-08-22|| Draw||align=left| Sanpetch Sor.Salacheep || Onesongchai, Rajadamnern Stadium || Bangkok, Thailand || Decision || 5 || 3:00
|-  style="background:#cfc;"
| 2018-07-26|| Win ||align=left| Roichuerng Singmawin || Onesongchai, Rajadamnern Stadium || Bangkok, Thailand || Decision || 5 || 3:00
|-  style="background:#fbb;"
| 2018-06-06|| Loss||align=left| Phetsuphan Por.Daorungruang || Onesongchai, Rajadamnern Stadium || Bangkok, Thailand ||Decision || 5 || 3:00
|-  style="background:#cfc;"
| 2018-04-02|| Win||align=left| Phetsuphan Por.Daorungruang || Onesongchai, Rajadamnern Stadium || Bangkok, Thailand ||Decision || 5 || 3:00
|-  style="background:#fbb;"
| 2018-03-05|| Loss||align=left| Phetsuphan Por.Daorungruang || Onesongchai, Rajadamnern Stadium || Bangkok, Thailand ||Decision || 5 || 3:00 
|-
! style=background:white colspan=9 |
|-  style="background:#cfc;"
| 2018-02-01|| Win||align=left| Kwandom Petchseemuen || Onesongchai, Rajadamnern Stadium || Bangkok, Thailand ||Decision || 5 || 3:00
|-  style="background:#fbb;"
| 2018-01-07|| Loss||align=left| Petchrung Sor.Jor.Vichitpaedriw || Muay Dee Vithithai, Blue Arena || Samut Prakan, Thailand ||Decision || 5 || 3:00 
|-
! style=background:white colspan=9 |
|-  style="background:#cfc;"
| 2017-12-15|| Win||align=left| Chaimongkhol Por.Aowtalaybangsaray || Lumpinee Stadium || Bangkok, Thailand ||Decision || 5 || 3:00
|-  style="background:#fbb;"
| 2017-11-02|| Loss||align=left| Kompatak SinbiMuayThai || Onesongchai, Rajadamnern Stadium || Bangkok, Thailand ||KO (High kick)|| 3 ||
|-  style="background:#fbb;"
| 2017-07-13|| Loss ||align=left| Puenkon Tor.Surat || Onesongchai, Rajadamnern Stadium || Bangkok, Thailand || KO || 3 ||
|-  style="background:#cfc;"
| 2017-06-07|| Win||align=left| Gingsanglek Tor.Laksong || Onesongchai, Rajadamnern Stadium || Bangkok, Thailand ||Decision || 5 || 3:00
|-  style="background:#fbb;"
| 2017-05-03|| Loss ||align=left| Puenkon Tor.Surat || Petchwittaya, Rajadamnern Stadium || Bangkok, Thailand || Decision || 5 || 3:00
|-  style="background:#cfc;"
| 2017-03-30|| Win||align=left| Phetchatchai Showraiaoi  || Rajadamnern Stadium || Bangkok, Thailand ||Decision || 5 || 3:00
|-  style="background:#fbb;"
| 2017-02-08|| Loss||align=left| Phetchatchai Showraiaoi  || Rajadamnern Stadium || Bangkok, Thailand ||Decision || 5 || 3:00
|-  style="background:#fbb;"
| 2017-01-15|| Loss||align=left| Ronachai Tor.Ramintra  || Rangsit Stadium || Rangsit, Thailand ||Decision || 5 || 3:00
|-  style="background:#fbb;"
| 2016-12-23|| Loss ||align=left| Yothin FA Group || Rangsit Stadium || Rangsit, Thailand || Decision  || 5 || 3:00
|-
! style=background:white colspan=9 |
|-  style="background:#fbb;"
| 2016-11-30|| Loss ||align=left| Puenkon Tor.Surat || Rajadamnern Stadium || Bangkok, Thailand || Decision || 5 || 3:00
|-  style="background:#cfc;"
| 2016-09-23|| Win||align=left| Methee Sor.Jor.Toipadriew ||  || Thailand || Decision || 5 || 3:00
|-  style="background:#c5d2ea;"
| 2016-08-30|| Draw||align=left| Sprinter Pangkongpap || Lumpinee Stadium || Bangkok, Thailand ||Decision || 5 || 3:00
|-  style="background:#cfc;"
| 2016-08-05|| Win||align=left| Thanuphet WitsanuKonLaKan || Lumpinee Stadium || Bangkok, Thailand ||Decision || 5 || 3:00
|-  style="background:#cfc;"
| 2016-07-08|| Win||align=left| Fahmai Sor.Sommai || Lumpinee Stadium || Bangkok, Thailand ||Decision || 5 || 3:00
|-  style="background:#fbb;"
| 2016-05-26|| Loss ||align=left| Pichitchai P.K.Saenchai  || Rajadamnern Stadium || Bangkok, Thailand || Decision|| 5 || 3:00
|-  style="background:#cfc;"
| 2016-04-06|| Win||align=left| Kengkla Por.Pekko || Rajadamnern Stadium || Bangkok, Thailand || Decision || 5 || 3:00
|-  style="background:#cfc;"
| 2016-03-16|| Win||align=left| Morakot Phetsimuen || Rajadamnern Stadium || Bangkok, Thailand || KO (Punches) || 5 ||
|-  style="background:#cfc;"
| 2016-02-24|| Win||align=left| Phetchatchai Showraiaoi  ||  || Bangkok, Thailand ||Decision || 5 || 3:00
|-  style="background:#cfc;"
| 2015-11-21|| Win||align=left| Sangdow Petchsimuen || Omnoi Stadium || Bangkok, Thailand ||Decision || 5 || 3:00
|-  style="background:#cfc;"
| 2015-10-26|| Win||align=left| Fahmongkol Tembangsai || Rajadamnern Stadium || Bangkok, Thailand || KO || 3 ||
|-  style="background:#cfc;"
| 2015-10-03|| Win||align=left| Phetchatchai Showraiaoi  || Montri Studio  || Bangkok, Thailand ||Decision || 5 || 3:00
|-  style="background:#fbb;"
| 2015-08-10|| Loss||align=left| Sangdow Petchsimuen || Rajadamnern Stadium || Bangkok, Thailand||Decision || 5 || 3:00
|-  style="background:#cfc;"
| 2015-07-12|| Win||align=left| Rungubon Maa Daeng || Rajadamnern Stadium || Bangkok, Thailand||Decision || 5 || 3:00
|-  style="background:#fbb;"
| 2015-06-04|| Loss||align=left| Pichitchai PK. Saenchaimuaythai || Rajadamnern Stadium || Bangkok, Thailand||KO (Left hook)|| 2 ||
|-  style="background:#cfc;"
| 2015-03-20|| Win||align=left| Nichao Suvitgym || Lumpinee Stadium || Bangkok, Thailand||KO || 5 ||
|-  style="background:#cfc;"
| 2015-01-19|| Win||align=left| Oley Tor.Laksong || Rajadamnern Stadium || Bangkok, Thailand||Decision || 5 || 3:00
|-  style="background:#fbb;"
| 2014-12-01|| Loss||align=left| Chaimongkol Banmikiew || Rajadamnern Stadium || Bangkok, Thailand||Decision || 5 || 3:00
|-  style="background:#cfc;"
| 2014-09-04|| Win||align=left| Yodman Huarongnakaeng || Rajadamnern Stadium ||Bangkok, Thailand || KO || 3 || 
|-  style="background:#fbb;"
| 2014-08-14|| Loss||align=left| Phetmuangchon Por.Suantong || Rajadamnern Stadium ||Bangkok, Thailand || Decision || 5 || 3:00
|-
! style=background:white colspan=9 |
|-  style="background:#cfc;"
| 2014-06-07|| Win||align=left|  Oley Sitniwat|| Omnoi Stadium || Samut Sakhon, Thailand||Decision || 5 || 3:00
|-
! style=background:white colspan=9 |

|-  style="background:#fbb;"
| 2013-08-10|| Loss||align=left| Boekban Lukmuangphet|| Omnoi Stadium || Samut Sakhon, Thailand||Decision || 5 || 3:00
|-  style="background:#fbb;"
| 2013-06-03|| Loss||align=left| Phetmuangchon Por.Suantong || Rajadamnern Stadium ||Bangkok, Thailand || Decision || 5 || 3:00
|-  style="background:#fbb;"
| 2013-05-02|| Loss||align=left| Pichitchai Or.Bor.Tor.Kampee|| Rajadamnern Stadium || Bangkok, Thailand||Decision || 5 || 3:00
|-  style="background:#fbb;"
| 2013-02-21|| Loss||align=left| Sanchai Tor.Laksong|| Rajadamnern Stadium || Bangkok, Thailand||Decision || 5 || 3:00
|-
! style=background:white colspan=9 |
|-
| colspan=9 | Legend:

References

Kumandoi Petcharoenvit
Living people
1994 births
Kumandoi Petcharoenvit